Ningde (Foochow Romanized: Nìng-dáik), also known as Mindong (Foochow Romanized: Mìng-dĕ̤ng; lit. East of Fujian), is a prefecture-level city located along the northeastern coast of Fujian province, People's Republic of China. It borders the provincial capital of Fuzhou to the south, Wenzhou (Zhejiang) to the north, and Nanping to the west. Ningde is listed No.2 in China Integrated City Index 2016's environmental ranking, a study conducted by the National Development and Reform Commission.

The prefecture-level Ningde City administers 1 district, 2 cities, 6 counties, as well as 124 towns, townships and subdistricts. Listed below are the district, cities and counties, first four of which are coastal whereas the rest locate in mountainous areas.

Like the rest of the province, Ningde sits in a mountainous region but it also enjoys almost  of coastline facing the East China Sea.

Economy

Agriculture
The warm and moist climate and fertile land in the prefecture of Ningde provide it with favorable conditions for agriculture. The largest agricultural exports from Ningde include mushroom and tea. The area also produces large quantities of various fruits, such as shaddocks, Chinese chestnuts, plums, honey peaches, lychees and longans.

Tea cultivation has long been an important industry of Ningde. By 1999 statistics, the total area of tea plantations in Ningde had reached  and the output of green tea took up 10.5 percent of that of the entire country. More than 1.2 million jobs were created directly and indirectly in different stages of the tea industry. Famous brands include the Tianshan Silver-Needle Tea, Baihao Silver-Needle Tea, Fenghuangshe, Lianyue Flower Tea and Xianyan Snow Peak.

The mountainous landscape and advantageous climate conditions are also beneficial to the development of forestry. Up to 1999, or 65.2 percent of the entire prefecture, are forested. Out of this area, bamboo groves occupy , producing an annual output of six million bamboo products.

Aquaculture
The prefecture of Ningde is blessed with vast area of shallow sea, which is suitable for aquaculture. In 2000, aquatic products take up 41.3 percent of the total output value of agriculture from Ningde, with an exporting value of US$82,170,000 and an annual net income exceeding RMB 3,500 for local fishermen. Major products include yellow croakers, oysters, razor clams, prawns and freshwater eels.

Local government is attempting to use aquaculture as a springboard to eliminate poverty and improve the local economy. Up to 2000, aquaculture had created 370,000 jobs directly and indirectly; a total of RMB 4.5 billion had been invested, drawing an annual output value of RMB 2 billion.

Industry
Ningde is the producer of many nonmetallic mineral resources, such as granite, diorite and basalt. The confirmed volume of granite reserves extends to 1,140 million cubic meters, while estimated amount of deposits undiscovered stands at several thousand million cubic meters.

Ningde's rich hydropower resources give it a headstart in metallurgical industries. Products such as magnesium, zirconium oxide, aluminum, high-purity silicon carbide, and a series of other silicon products from plants in the prefecture enjoy high reputation and are exempted from examination when exported to Japan. Advances in metallurgical technology also aids the shipbuilding industry, a traditional trade in Ningde. In recent years, local shipyards have been capable of constructing 10,000-ton steamships.

Ningde owns electricity industry providing energy supply for the need of local as well as for other metropolitan areas such as Fuzhou and Wenzhou. 
China Datang Corporation runs 2520 MW fired power plant in Fu'an City. The first nuclear power plant Ningde Nuclear Power Plant start to operate from 2008. CFR-600 is under construction in Xiapu county.

Battery industry is another fast growing sector in Ningde region. CATL (寧德時代), the world's biggest lithium-ion batteries manufacturer has its headquarter and product line combining with upper stream product lines located in Jiaocheng district of Ningde.

Demographic substructure
According to the 2010 Census, Ningde has a registered population of 3,393,698 inhabitants, although 2,821,996 persons declared to be permanent residents. It is also the primary residential region for the She minority people, who take up to 25% of the total population.
A majority of the population speak Eastern Min.

Climate
It is subjected to a humid subtropical climate, with occasional threat of typhoons. The region also enjoys a frost-free period of 235 to 300 days per year, which is highly beneficial for soil agriculture.

History

Ningde's history dates back to the Stamped Pottery Culture System. As early as 10,000 to 20,000 years ago during the late Upper Palaeolithic period of the Stone Age (also known as the Old Stone Age) there were already human beings living and multiplying here. In 282, the Jin Dynasty government established magistrate rule here.

Mongol-Manchu
During the first twenty-three years of the Yuan dynasty (1206−1368), Funingzhou Administration was set up. In 1736, during the reign of the Yongzheng Emperor of the Qing dynasty, Ningde was promoted to Funingfu Administration.

Republican
In 1934, an Administration Supervision Zone was set up here under the Republic of China. After the establishment of the People's Republic of China in 1949, the Fu'an Special Administration Zone was established. Finally in June 1971 the Zone was promoted to Ningde Prefecture. Xi Jinping served as party chief of Ningde between 1988 and 1990.

Culture
The folk arts in Ningde are varied and colorful. Among them bantieji parade, puppet lion dance, and paper art are the most representative.

The bantieji parade, mostly seen during the Chinese new year, is a folk art performance popularized in Ningde since the Qing Dynasty. During the parade, children dressed as characters from various Chinese folklore sit or stand on parade vehicles, which were also decorated to resemble classic scenes such as the Heavenly Palace. The vehicles then cruise along the streets in the company of jovial music.

The puppet lion dance, popular in Huotong Town and Jiaocheng District, originated from toys of the local children. The lions, made of colorful fabrics, are connected to wooden racks by ropes. Each individual rope controls a part of the lion's body, such as the head, tail or foot. The racks are set on vehicles moving through the streets. Performers on the vehicles pull on the ropes to make the lions dance or perform various tricks.

Paper art, mainly practised by women, is a specialty of Zherong County. Common forms of the art include traditional flower patterns, words and daily life objects. Because of her paper art achievements, Zherong County was named "Home of Chinese Folk Arts" by the Ministry of Culture in 2000.

The She people have also created and left many precious cultural heritages in their long historical practice. Owing to projects in recent years to protect the She heritage, three volumes of She folk tales, songs and proverbs have been published. In total, 184 tales, 330,000 words in songs, and 6,000 proverbs have been included. Art works have also been produced out of She folklore, which reflects their way of life.

There are many covered bridges in Ningde, particularly in Pingnan. 15,000-capacity Ningde Stadium is located in the city. It is mostly used for association football.

The Ningde UNESCO Global Geopark was created in 2015 in a volcanic region of the coast, comprising  Baishuiyang, Taimushan and Baiyunshan scenic areas.

See also
 CATL
 Mount Taimu

References

External links

 Ningde Government Website
Ningde Bureau of Statistics

 
Cities in Fujian
Prefecture-level divisions of Fujian